Ishma is a Rural municipality located within the Gulmi District of the Lumbini Province of Nepal.
The rural municipality spans  of area, with a total population of 20,964 according to a 2011 Nepal census.

On March 10, 2017, the Government of Nepal restructured the local level bodies into 753 new local level structures.
The previous Hastichaur, Dalamchaur, Isma Rajasthal, Dohali and Amarpur VDCs were merged to form Ishma Rural Municipality.
Ishma is divided into 6 wards, with Isma Rajasthal declared the administrative center of the rural municipality.

References

External links
official website of the rural municipality

Rural municipalities in Gulmi District
Rural municipalities of Nepal established in 2017